ProvidusBank PLC (PB), is a Nigerian financial services provider, licensed as a commercial bank, by the Central Bank of Nigeria, the central bank and national banking regulator.

Location
The headquarters and main branch of this bank are located at 724 Adetokunbo Ademola Street, Victoria Island, Lagos, in the city of Lagos, the financial capital of Nigeria. The geographical coordinates of the bank's headquarters are: 
6°25'53.0"N, 3°25'50.0"E (Latitude:6.431389; Longitude:3.430556).

Overview
As of November 2018, Providus Bank was registered as a regional commercial bank, serving clients in Lagos State and in the Nigerian Federal Capital Territory. The bank aims to serve large corporations, government agencies,  institutions, small and medium sized enterprises and high net worth individuals.

History
The bank was granted a regional banking license by the Central Bank of Nigeria in June 2016.

See also
List of banks in Nigeria

References

External links
 
Providus Bank Gets Commercial Banking Licence from CBN As of 15 June 2016.

Banks of Nigeria
Companies based in Lagos
Banks established in 2016
Nigerian companies established in 2016